The Gould–Jacobs reaction is an organic synthesis for the preparation of quinolines and 4‐hydroxyquinoline derivatives. The Gould-Jacobs reaction is a series of reactions. The series of reactions begins with the condensation/substitution of an aniline with alkoxy methylenemalonic ester or acyl malonic ester, producing anilidomethylenemalonic ester. Then through a 6 electron cyclization process, 4-hydroxy-3-carboalkoxyquinoline is formed, which exist mostly in the 4-oxo form. Saponification results in the formation of an acid. This step is followed by decarboxylation to give 4-hydroxyquinoline. The Gould-Jacobs reaction is effective for anilines with electron‐donating groups at the meta‐position.

Specifically, 4-quinolinol can be synthesized.  In this reaction aniline or an aniline derivative first reacts with malonic acid derivative ethyl ethoxymethylenemalonate with substitution of the ethoxy group by nitrogen. A benzannulation takes place by application of heat to a quinoline. The ester group is hydrolysed by sodium hydroxide to the carboxylic acid and decarboxylation again by application of heat to 4-hydroxyquinoline.

Extension of the Gould-Jacobs approach can prepare unsubstituted parent heterocycles with fused pyridine ring of Skraup type (see Skraup reaction).

Further reading:

Mechanism
The mechanism for the Gould–Jacobs reaction begins with a nucleophilic attack from the amine nitrogen follows by the loss of ethanol to form the condensation product. A 6 electron cyclization reaction with the loss of another ethanol molecule forms a quinoline (ethyl 4-oxo-4,4a-dihydroquinoline-3-carboxylate). The enol form can be represented from the keto form through keto-enol tautomerism. Protonation of the nitrogen forms ethyl 4-oxo-1,4-dihydroquinoline-3-carboxylate.

Examples and applications
An example is the synthesis of 4,7-dichloroquinoline.

Floctafenine and glafenine are a pair of fenamate NSAIDs whose syntheses rely on the Gould–Jacobs reaction.
Several quinolone antibiotic structures such as rosoxacin, oxolinic acid, droxacin, etc.

Another example is in the synthesis of antimalarials as aminoalkylamino derivatives of 2,3-dihydrofuroquinolines

The Gould reaction is also used to convert 5-aminoindole to quinolines for the purpose of synthesizing pyrazolo[4,3-c]pyrrolo[3,2-f]quinolin-3-one derivatives as modified pyrazoloquinolinone analogs. These compounds have the potential to act as antagonists at central benzodiazepine receptors (BZRs) in Xenopus laevis oocytes.

The Gould‐Jacobs reaction has also been used both conventionally with condensation steps and acyclic intermediated and with single step microwave irradiation to synthesize ethyl 4‐oxo‐8,10‐substituted‐4,8‐dihydropyrimido[1,2‐c]pyrrolo[3,2‐e]pyrimidine‐3‐carboxylates.

References

Quinoline forming reactions
Name reactions